Sanjay Gandhi Postgraduate Institute of Medical Sciences is a medical Institute under the State Legislature Act in Lucknow, Uttar Pradesh,  south of Hazratganj on Raebareli Road. It was established in 1983 and is named after Sanjay Gandhi.

The institute is located on  residential campus on Raebareli Road. The institute offers degrees recognized by the Medical Council of India. It provides tertiary-level medical care, teaching, training, and research for specialties. Degrees at the DM, MCh, MD , and Ph.D. levels are offered, along with postdoctoral fellowships and postdoctoral certificate courses in various disciplines. offers training programs for senior residents. The College of Medical Technology offers B.Sc. courses in nursing and BSc/MSc courses in paramedical technology in allied sciences. The institute is an autonomous institution. The institute functions as a state college are a member of the Association of Indian Universities and are recognized by the College Grants Commission.

Programs and faculty
As part of the postgraduate medical training, the institute has a working tertiary care referral hospital that provides inexpensive medical care. This hospital offers treatment to patients from the whole of Uttar Pradesh, and neighboring states such as Bihar, Madhya Pradesh, Chhattisgarh, Uttarakhand, Orissa, and West Bengal. It is also available to almost the whole of India and neighboring countries including Nepal, Bangladesh, Pakistan, Sri Lanka, Bhutan, and Middle Eastern countries. Because of this reach, it is considered a destination for medical tourism.

The institute employs over 250 faculty members across 32 departments. Each department consists of teaching, training, patient care, and research. Professor R.K. Dhiman became head of the institute in January 2020. The dean, who is responsible for overseeing academic activities, is Prof Anish Srivastava. Prof Gaurav Agarwal is the chief medical superintendent- the overall chief of the hospital, who is assisted by Dr. VK Paliwal, the medical superintendent. It is known for being the first among all government hospitals in India to implement the Oracle-based HIS system in 1997. In 2019 the HIS was updated to be fully integrated with the PAX and telemedicine network. This was meant to provide convenience and security for patients and healthcare providers.

The institute has departments for the following fields:
 Emergency Medicine  
Anesthesiology , Intensive Care & Pain Management
Hematology / haemato-oncology & Bone marrow transplantation unit
Clinical Immunology & Rheumatology
Neurosurgery
Neurology
Surgical Gastroenterology & Liver Transplantation unit
Gastroenterology
Cardio-Vascular & thoracic surgery
Critical Care Medicine 
Cardiology
Urology 
Nephrology
Endocrine & Breast Surgery
Endocrinology
Medical Genetics
Radiotherapy / Radiation and clinical oncology - Regional Cancer Centre
Biostatistics and Health Informatics
Nuclear Medicine
Pathology
Pulmonary Medicine
Microbiology
Radiology
Transfusion Medicine
Plastic Surgery & Burns
Molecular Medicine
Maternal & Fetal Medicine
Pulmonary Medicine
Pediatric surgical super-specialties
Hospital administration
Pediatric gastroenterology

The institute also has a Telemedicine unit as part of the School of Tele-Medicine & Biomedical Informatics.

Academic courses and facilities 

ranking medical. The institute has many training programs in various specialties. These include a Doctor of Medicine, M.Ch. (Magister Chirurgie), and MD (Doctor of Medicine) programs. It also runs Ph.D. programs for basic science research and B.Sc. Nursing 4 years courses.

The library has more than 21,000 books and subscriptions to nearly 450 scientific journals. There is the main auditorium, a smaller auditorium, and seminar rooms.

All students complete two compulsory courses (Basic Course and Course on Biostatistics), and two optional courses from among those offered, including Scientific Communication, Clinical Decision Analysis, Research Methodology, Laboratory Instrumentation, Computer Applications, Biomedical Literature Search, Bioinformatics, Basic Immunology, Medical Physics, and Molecular Biology, etc. and all MD programs require a thesis. The DM and MCh programs require publications in indexed national/international journals. All residents take an entrance test.

During the COVID-19 pandemic, SGPGI was required to train some doctors virtually.

SGPGI Hospital
The hospital works as a referral hospital, though patients who require treatment that SGPGI are sometimes admitted without a referral. It is a UP state government-owned hospital and it is often less expensive for patients to receive care there than private hospitals of comparable quality in India.

The Institute hospital endeavors to work on an appointment system. Thus, the patients are expected to re-visit the Institute hospital only on appointed days, except in case of an emergency. Patients once seen are usually provided an appointment for any investigations, outpatient consultation, admission for treatment and surgery. The in-patient treatment at SGPGIMS hospital is highly organized and all efforts are made to reduce inconvenience to patients, that is usually the case at various government hospitals. The on-line health information system of the hospital is synchronized to the online billing system and online pharmacy. Patients are provided all medicines, consumables, surgical material etc. at the bed-side, for which the patients are charged a highly subsidised cost, in most cases—about 30–40% less than the MRP.

SGPGI does not treat general medical emergencies but it takes patients related to the university specialties. Sometimes patients are referred to SGPGI through other hospitals.

Other facilities
The campus has several facilities for patients and their attendants. These include:
PRA: Patients' relatives' accommodation, available to relatives of patients admitted to the hospital, on payment basis.
Vishramalaya: A daytime facility for outpatients and relatives with lockers, a place to relax, a restaurant, bathrooms, toilets, etc.
Cafeteria, bank, post office, shops for drugs and medical consumables.

Notable people

Notable alumni

 
Amita Aggarwal, DM (1993)
Ashutosh Tewari, MCh (1994)
Kanneboyina Nagaraju, PhD (1995)
Harish Poptani, PhD (1995)
Ramakant Yadav, DM (2006)

Notable faculty
 
Shyam Swarup Agarwal
Rakesh Aggarwal
Mahendra Bhandari
Sita Naik
Sunil Pradhan
Rajan Saxena
Amita Aggarwal

See also

Jawaharlal Institute of Postgraduate Medical Education and Research
Postgraduate Institute of Medical Education and Research
King George's Medical University
Uttar Pradesh University of Medical Sciences
Dr. Ram Manohar Lohia Institute of Medical Sciences

References

External links
 https://sgpgims.org.in/

 
Institute under State Legislature Act
Medical and health sciences universities in India
Regional Cancer Centres in India
Medical colleges in Uttar Pradesh
Universities and colleges in Lucknow
Educational institutions established in 1983
1983 establishments in Uttar Pradesh
Research institutes in Lucknow